Sarpada is a raga in Hindustani classical music. It is a raga sung in the morning, that belongs to the Bilaval thaat.

History
Amir Khusrau is said to have created about twelve new melodies, among which is Sarpada.

References

Hindustani ragas